Calliostoma formosense, common name the Formosa top shell, is a species of sea snail, a marine gastropod mollusk in the family Calliostomatidae.

Some authors place this taxon in the subgenus Calliostoma (Benthastelena).

Description
The size of the shell varies between 35 mm and 63 mm.

Distribution
This marine species occurs off Taiwan.

References

External links
 

formosense
Gastropods described in 1907